Sir William John Clarke, 1st Baronet  (31 March 1831 – 15 May 1897), was an Australian businessman and philanthropist in the Colony of Victoria. He was raised to the baronetage in 1882, the first Victorian to be granted a hereditary honour.

Clarke was born in Van Diemen's Land, the son of the pastoralist William John Turner Clarke. He arrived in the Port Phillip District (the future Victoria) in 1850, where he managed many of his father's properties and acquired some of his own. Upon his father's death in 1874, he became the largest landowner in the colony. Clarke was made a baronet for his work as the head of the Melbourne International Exhibition, which brought Australia to international attention. He also served terms as president of the Australian Club, president of the Victorian Football Association, and president of the Melbourne Cricket Club, and was prominent in yachting and horse racing circles. Clarke gave generously to charitable organisations, and also made significant financial contributions to the Anglican Diocese of Melbourne and the University of Melbourne. He was a member of the Victorian Legislative Council from 1878 until 1897, although he was not particularly active in politics.

Early life
Clarke was born at Lovely Banks (one of his father's properties, near Jericho) in Van Diemen's Land (later renamed Tasmania), the eldest of three sons of William John Turner Clarke and his wife Eliza (née Dowling). Clarke senior was an early Tasmanian colonist, who acquired large pastoral properties in Tasmania, Victoria, South Australia and New Zealand and settled afterwards in Victoria at Rupertswood, Sunbury.

Clarke first arrived in Victoria in 1850, when he spent a couple of years in the study of sheep farming on his father's Dowling Forest station, and afterwards in the management of the Woodlands station on the Wimmera. For the next ten years he resided in Tasmania, working the Norton-Mandeville estate in conjunction with his brother, Joseph Clarke.

Career

Clarke took some interest in local government and was chairman of the Braybrook Road Board. On the death of his father he found himself with a very large income, much of which he began to use for the benefit of the state. His largest gifts were £10,000 for the building fund of St Paul's cathedral and £7000 for Trinity College, Melbourne University. In 1862 Clarke stood against George Higinbotham in the Brighton by-election for the Victorian Legislative Assembly, but was not elected. He was elected a member of the Victorian Legislative Council for the Southern Province in September 1878, but never took a prominent part in politics.

In 1862 Clarke assumed the management of his father's concerns in Victoria, and on the latter's death in 1874 succeeded to his estates in that colony. In the same year he was appointed president of the commissioners of the Melbourne international exhibition which was opened on 1 October 1880. In 1882 he gave £3,000 to found a scholarship in the Royal College of Music.

For many years Clarke bore the full expense of the Rupertswood battery of horse artillery at Sunbury, Victoria.
Amongst Sir William Clarke's other public donations are the gift of £2000 to the Indian Famine Relief Fund, of £10,000 towards building the Anglican Cathedral at Melbourne, and of £7000 to Trinity College, Melbourne University.

Clarke also took interest in various forms of sport, his yacht, the Janet, won several races, but he was not very successful on the turf; the most important race he won being the V.R.C. Oaks. He was the inaugural president of the Victorian Football Association, presiding from 1877 until 1882. He was the patron of many agricultural societies and did much to improve the breed of cattle in Victoria. Before the Victorian department of agriculture was established he provided a laboratory for Ralph Waldo Emerson MacIvor, 
and paid him to lecture on agricultural chemistry in farming centres. In 1886, he was a member of the Victorian commission to the Colonial and Indian exhibition, and in the same year Cambridge gave him the honorary degree of LL.D.

Clarke was a very prominent Victorian Freemason and was elected provincial grand master of the Irish Constitution in 1881 and then district grand master of both the Scottish and English Constitutions in 1884. In 1889 he became the very first Most Worshipful Grand Master of the United Grand Lodge of Victoria, an amalgamation of the three bodies that had operated at that time under their own constitutions. In 1885 he had largely financed the building of the Freemasons' Hall at 25 Collins Street.

Later life
In Clarke's later years, although his interests lay principally in the country, he lived at his town house Cliveden in East Melbourne. He died suddenly at Melbourne on 15 May 1897. He was created a baronet in 1882, by Queen Victoria in recognition for his many donations and for his presiding over the Melbourne International Exhibition in 1880.

He married twice, firstly in 1860 to Mary Walker, daughter of the Tasmanian businessman and politician John Walker. He was widowed in April 1871, and in January 1873 remarried to Janet Marian Snodgrass, the daughter of the Victorian pastoralist and politician Peter Snodgrass. He had two sons and two daughters by his first wife, and another four sons and four daughters by his second; he was survived by Janet and nine of his children.

Clarke was a household name in Victoria.  He made a few large donations but his help could constantly be relied on by hospitals, charitable institutions, and agricultural and other societies. He divided one of his estates into small holdings and was a model landlord, and he showed much foresight in allying science with agriculture by employing MacIvor as a lecturer.  His second wife, Janet, who had been associated with him in philanthropic movements, kept up her interest in them, especially in all matters relating to women, until her death on 28 April 1909. One of their sons, Sir Francis Grenville Clarke, went into politics and was a member of several Victorian ministries. He became president of the Legislative Council in 1923 and held that position for almost 20 years and was created K.B.E. in 1926.

His son Rupert succeeded him as the 2nd Baronet. The baronetcy of Clarke of Rupertswood is one of only two active hereditary titles in an Australian family.

His second son, Ernest Edward Dowling Clarke (1869–1941), was a noted racehorse owner, closely associated with trainer James Scobie.

Footnotes

References

Sylvia Morrissey, 'Clarke, Sir William John (1831 - 1897)', Australian Dictionary of Biography, Volume 3, MUP, 1969, pp 422–424.

1831 births
1897 deaths
Australian recipients of a British baronetcy
Members of the Victorian Legislative Council
VFA/VFL administrators
Australian Freemasons
Masonic Grand Masters
Baronets in the Baronetage of the United Kingdom
19th-century Australian politicians
People from Tasmania
Australian pastoralists
19th-century Australian philanthropists
19th-century Australian businesspeople
Clarke baronets
Australian people of English descent